Fred or Frederick Holliday may refer to:

 Frederick W. M. Holliday (1828–1899), governor of Virginia
 Fred Holliday (academic) (1935–2016), marine biologist, academic, and businessman
 Fred Parkinson Holliday (1888–1980), Australian flying ace
 Fred Grossinger (1936–1995), American actor known as Fred Holliday
 Frederick D. Holliday (1927–1985), American educator and Public School Superintendent

See also
 Fredrick William Holiday (1921–1979), English journalist, angler, cryptozoologist and wildlife specialist